Storeria occipitomaculata obscura, the Florida redbelly snake, is a subspecies of the redbelly snake that ranges from the northern peninsula to southern Florida. they are found in pinelands, bogs, marshes, ponds, and swamps. They will grow to be 8-10 inches with the largest being 16 inches. They look similar to the ring-necked snake because of the red belly and the ring around its neck. it is distinguished from them because the Florida redbelly snake has a stripe down its back and is brown while the ring-necked snake has no stripe and is gray.

References

Endemic fauna of Florida
Storeria
Reptiles of the United States